Sekolah Menengah Kebangsaan  Putrajaya Presint 9 (1), or Putrajaya Precinct 9 National High School (SMKPP9(1)), is a secondary school to be built in the area of Putrajaya, Malaysia. It is located in Precinct 9, Putrajaya.

See also
 List of schools in Malaysia
 Putrajaya

Schools in Putrajaya
Secondary schools in Malaysia
2002 establishments in Malaysia